Jordanus (-), distinguished as JordanofSeverac or JordanofCatalonia, was a Catalan Dominican missionary and explorer in Asia known for his Mirabilia Descripta describing the marvels of the East. He was the first bishop of the Roman Catholic Diocese of Quilon, the first Roman Catholic diocese in India.

Travels

Jordanus was perhaps born at Sévérac-le-Château, north-east of Toulouse. Possibly a disciple of Jerome de Catalonia, also known as Hieronymus Catalani, in 1302 Jordanus may have accompanied St Thomas of Tolentino, via Negropont, to the East; but it is only in 1321 that we definitely discover him in western India, in the company of Thomas and his companions. Ill-luck detained them at Thane in Salsette Island, near Bombay; and here Jordanus's companions were killed on 8 and 11 April 1321.

Jordanus, escaping, worked some time at Bharuch, in Gujarat, near the Nerbudda estuary, and at Suali (?) near Surat; to his fellow-Dominicans in north Persia he wrote two letters — the first from Gogo in Gujarat (12 October 1321), the second from Thane (24 January 1323/4) describing the progress of this new mission. From these letters we learn that Roman attention had already been directed, not only to the Bombay region, but also to the extreme south of the Indian peninsula, especially to Columbum, Quilon or Kollam in later Travancore; Jordanus' words may imply that he had already started a mission there before October 1321.

From Catholic traders Jordanus had learnt that Ethiopia (i.e. Abyssinia and Nubia) was accessible to Western Europeans; at this very time, as we know from other sources, the earliest Latin missionaries penetrated thither. Finally, the Epistles of Jordanus, like the contemporary Secreta of Marino Sanuto (1306–1321), urge the Pope to establish a Christian fleet upon the Indian seas.

Jordanus, between 1324 and 1328 (if not earlier), probably visited Kollam and selected it as the best centre for his future work; it would also appear that he revisited Europe about 1328, passing through Persia, and perhaps touching at the great Crimean port of Soidaia or Sudak. He was appointed a bishop in 1328 and nominated by Pope John XXII in his bull Venerabili Fratri Jordano to the see of Columbum or Kollam (Quilon) on 21 August 1329. This diocese was the first Roman Catholic one in the whole of the Indies, with jurisdiction over modern India, Pakistan, Afghanistan, Bangladesh, Burma, and Sri Lanka. It was created on 9 August by the decree Romanus Pontifix. Together with the new bishop of Samarkand, Thomas of Mancasola, Jordanus was commissioned to take the pallium to John de Cora, archbishop of Sultaniyah in Persia, within whose province Kollam was reckoned; he was also commended to the Christians of south India, both east and west of Cape Comorin, by Pope John.

Mirabilia Descripta

Either before going out to Malabar as bishop, or during a later visit to the west, Jordanus probably wrote his Mirabilia, which from internal evidence can only be fixed within the period 1329–1338; in this work he furnished the best account of Indian regions, products, climate, manners, customs, fauna and flora given by any European in the Middle Ages — superior even to Marco Polo's. 

In his triple division of the Indies, India Major comprises the shorelands from Malabar to Cochin China; while India Minor stretches from Sind (or perhaps from Baluchistan) to Malabar; and India Tertia (evidently dominated by African conceptions in his mind) includes a vast undefined coast-region west of Baluchistan, reaching into the neighborhood of, but not including, Ethiopia and Prester John's domain.  Jordanus' Mirabilia contains the earliest clear African identification of Prester John, and what is perhaps the first notice of the Black Sea under that name; it refers to the author's residence in India Major and especially at Kollam, as well as to his travels in Armenia, north-west Persia, the Lake Van region, and Chaldaea; and it supplies excellent descriptions of Parsee doctrines and burial customs, of Hindu ox-worship, idol-ritual, and suttee, and of Indian fruits, birds, animals and insects. After 8 April 1330 we have no more knowledge of Bishop Jordanus I.

Extracts of Mirabilia Descripta

See also
Chronology of European exploration of Asia

Notes

References

Primary sources
Of Jordanus' Epistles there is only one MS., viz. Paris, National Library, 5006 Lat., fol. 182, r. and v.; of the Mirabilia also one MS. only, viz. London, British Library, Additional MSS., 19513, fols. 3, r.f 2 r.

The text of the Epistles is in Quétif–Échard, Scriptores ordinis praedicatorum, i. 549-550 (Epistle I.)
and in Wadding, Annales minorum, vi. 359-361 (Epistle II.)
Latin text of the Mirabilia: 
English translation of the Mirabilia as The Wonders of the East.
The Papal letters referring to Jordanus are in Odericus Raynaldus, Annales ecclesiastici, 1330, f lv. and lvii (8 April; 14 February).

Secondary sources

 Henry Yule's Cathay, giving a version of the Epistles, with a commentary, &c. (Hakluyt Society, 1866) pp. 184–185, 192–196, 225-230

F. Kunstmann, Die Mission in Meliapor und Tana und die Mission in Columbo in the Historisch-politische Blätter of Phillips and Görres, xxxvii. 2538, 135-152 (Munich, 1856), &c.

14th-century explorers
14th-century Roman Catholic bishops in India
Spanish explorers
Spanish Dominicans
French explorers
French Dominicans
1321 births
1330 deaths
Occitan-speaking people